Fangavaktin is the sequel to the Icelandic television series Dagvaktin and the final series in the trilogy.  The three main characters from Næturvaktin, Georg Bjarnfreðarson (Jón Gnarr), Ólafur Ragnar (Pétur Jóhann Sigfússon) and Daníel (Jörundur Ragnarsson), have become imprisoned in the infamous Litla-Hraun prison following the murder of the hotel owner in Dagvaktin. The story is continued, and brought to a conclusion, in the feature film Bjarnfreðarson.

The first episode was broadcast on Stöð 2 on Sunday, 27 September 2009, and an episode was broadcast each following Sunday until the final seventh episode aired on 8 November 2009.  The series has been released on DVD.

Cast
Jón Gnarr as Georg Bjarnfreðarson
Pétur Jóhann Sigfússon as Ólafur Ragnar
Jörundur Ragnarsson as Daníel
Björn Thors as Kenneth Máni
Ólafur Darri Ólafsson
Ingvar Sigurðsson as Viggó

See also
 Næturvaktin
 Dagvaktin
 Bjarnfreðarson

External links
 

Icelandic comedy television series
Icelandic-language television shows
2009 Icelandic television series debuts
2000s Icelandic television series
Stöð 2 original programming